Bitti is a comune (municipality) in the Province of Nuoro in the Italian region Sardinia, about  north of Cagliari and about  north of Nuoro.

Bitti borders the municipalities of Alà dei Sardi, Buddusò, Lodè, Lula, Nule, Onanì, Orune, Osidda, and Padru.

History

The commune takes its name from the Sardinian bitta (female deer). Already existing in Roman times, it is mentioned in 1170 as Bitthe. Bitti was a provincial capital of the Giudicato of Gallura and, from the 14th century, was part of the Giudicato of Torres. It was later included in the marquisate of Orani.

Main sights
Su Romanzesu nuragic archaeological complex
Church of Santu Jorgi (St. George)

See also
 Tenores di Bitti, a folk music group from the comune

References

External links

 Official website

Cities and towns in Sardinia